James Joseph Drumm (1897 – 1974) was an Irish chemist and the inventor of the  Drumm battery.

Life 
Drumm was born in Dundrum, County Down, in 1897, and initially attended a national school where his mother taught. His secondary education was at St Macartan's College, Monaghan, where he won a county council scholarship.

From 1914 to 1917 he studied at the Chemistry School of University College Dublin (UCD) and then worked in England at the Continuous Reaction Company. In 1922 he returned to Dublin as a chemist for research and production at Fine Chemicals Ltd.  He then worked for various companies and participated in research projects. He modernized various processing methods, such as the conservation of peas, to keep their natural green colour in tin cans.

According to Casey, from 1926 to 1931, Drumm worked tirelessly on a new accumulator and finally presented the Drumm Traction Battery.  In 1931 he was distinguished for his researches by the National University of Ireland as Doctor of Natural Sciences.

His most famous research result was an electric storage battery, which was also known by his name.  Drumm's original idea was to use a Hydroquinone Electrode in a battery cell for power generation. After some experiments, he devoted his attention to alkaline cells. At Drumm's time the only available batteries were based on lead, lead dioxide and sulphuric acid. The iron-nickel alkaline battery was developed by Thomas Edison.  Drumm created his first battery at UCD Merrion street and negotiation with the Government led to a prototype conversion of petrol railcar 386 in July 1930.  Following successful trials two trains were built at Inchicore and entered regular service on the Dublin-Bray route with charging stations being built at each end.  Two more trains were built in 1939 and they continued in service until 1949.

See also 
 Irish Chemical News Spring 1988

References

Notes

Footnotes

Sources

External links 

 Biography of James J. Drumm
  Irish locomotive development

1897 births
1974 deaths
Irish chemists
Alumni of University College Dublin
20th-century Irish people
Irish people in rail transport